"Confusion" is the second song from the 1979 Electric Light Orchestra (ELO) album Discovery. It features 12-string acoustic guitar and vocoder.

It was released in the UK as a double A-side single with "Last Train to London". It peaked at number 8 in the UK Singles Chart making it the fourth consecutive top 10 single to be taken from the Discovery album. In the United States the song was released as a single with "Poker" on the B-side becoming a more modest hit, reaching number 37 on the Billboard Hot 100.

Billboard rated "Confusion" as "a superbly crafted single," describing it as "a mid-tempo rock track that mixes a Beatlesque sound with a hint of disco."  Cash Box called it a "bubbly Lynne concoction, mixing glossy pop melody with alternately grandiose and circus-like keyboard fills" and praised the song's hook and craftsmanship."  Record World called it a "mellifluous, pop disc with the everpresent falsetto vocals & keyboard gymnastics."

Charts

References

External links
 

1979 songs
Electric Light Orchestra songs
Song recordings produced by Jeff Lynne
Songs written by Jeff Lynne
Jet Records singles
1979 singles